Rio Novo National Park is a national park in the state of Pará, Brazil.

Location

It covers parts of the municipalities of Novo Progresso and Itaituba in Pará.
The park is in an area of low-relief plateaus and depressions.
The west is on the Parauari-Tropas plateau, broken hilly country with elevations from 

The park is in the basins of the Jamanxim and Crepori rivers, tributaries of the Tapajós.
The main river in the park is the Rio Novo, a major tributary of the Jamanxim formed by the juncture of the Inambé and Marrom rivers.
There are several waterfalls and rapids in the park due to the drop from the south to the north.
Most of the streams have been contaminated by the illegal mining in the region.
The park adjoins the Mundurucu Indigenous Territory to the west.
It adjoins the Jamanxim National Forest to the east.

Environment

The Rio Novo National Park is in the Amazon biome.
It is in a region of contact between the cerrado and Amazon forest, and has at least six different zones of vegetation due to the difference in altitude between the Serra do Cachimbo and the Amazon lowlands.
Roughly 53% is covered by open rainforest, 33% by dense rainforest and 14% by contact between savannah and seasonal forest.
The endangered white-cheeked spider monkey (Ateles marginatus) is an endemic species.

Conservation

The Rio Novo National Park was created by decree on 13 February 2006 and is administered by the Chico Mendes Institute for Biodiversity Conservation (ICMBio).
An advisory council was created on 8 November 2011.
It is classified as IUCN protected area category II (national park).
The objective is to preserve natural ecosystems of great ecological relevance and scenic beauty and to enable scientific research, educational activities, environmental interpretation, recreation in contact with nature and ecological tourism.
The park is open to visitors with special permission.

The park is in a region that contains 12 sustainable use conservation areas and 6 fully protected areas.
The fully protected areas, which cover , are the Amazônia, Jamanxim, Rio Novo and Serra do Pardo national parks, the Nascentes da Serra do Cachimbo Biological Reserve and the Terra do Meio Ecological Station.
The conservation unit is supported by the Amazon Region Protected Areas Program.

Notes

Sources

External links

2006 establishments in Brazil
National parks of Brazil
Protected areas of Pará